Miamimyia is a genus of parasitic flies in the family Tachinidae.

Species
Miamimyia antennalis Guimarães, 1982
Miamimyia cincta Townsend, 1916
Miamimyia lopesi Guimarães, 1982

References

Diptera of South America
Diptera of North America
Exoristinae
Tachinidae genera
Taxa named by Charles Henry Tyler Townsend